Rudolf den Hamer (July 24, 1917 in Buitenzorg, Dutch East Indies – March 14, 1988 in The Hague) was a Dutch water polo player who competed in the 1936 Summer Olympics. He was part of the Dutch team which finished fifth in the 1936 tournament. He played four matches.

References

1917 births
1988 deaths
Dutch male water polo players
Water polo players at the 1936 Summer Olympics
Olympic water polo players of the Netherlands
People from Bogor
Dutch people of the Dutch East Indies
20th-century Dutch people